The 1938 Southern Conference men's basketball tournament took place from March 3–5, 1938 at Thompson Gym in Raleigh, North Carolina. The Duke Blue Devils won their first Southern Conference title, led by head coach Eddie Cameron.

Format
The top eight finishers of the conference's fifteen members were eligible for the tournament. Teams were seeded based on conference winning percentage. The tournament used a preset bracket consisting of three rounds.

Bracket

* Overtime game

See also
List of Southern Conference men's basketball champions

References

Tournament
Southern Conference men's basketball tournament
Southern Conference men's basketball tournament
Southern Conference men's basketball tournament
Basketball competitions in Raleigh, North Carolina
College sports tournaments in North Carolina
College basketball in North Carolina